NHL FaceOff is a video game developed by Sony Interactive Studios America and published by Sony Computer Entertainment for the PlayStation. It is the first game in the NHL FaceOff series.

Gameplay
NHL FaceOff is a hockey game that features a 3D arena.

Reception
Next Generation reviewed the PlayStation version of the game, rating it five stars out of five, and stated that "Overall, NHL Face Off is exactly the kind of 32-bit hockey experience you'd expect and want."

The game sold in excess of 200,000 units.

Reviews
GameFan (Jan, 1996)
GamePro (Mar, 1996)
Electronic Gaming Monthly (Feb, 1996)
Video Games & Computer Entertainment - Feb, 1996
IGN - Nov 25, 1996
Game Revolution - Jun 04, 2004
All Game Guide - 1998

References

External links
 NHL FaceOff at GameFAQs
 NHL FaceOff at Giant Bomb
 NHL FaceOff at MobyGames

1995 video games
NHL FaceOff
PlayStation (console) games
PlayStation (console)-only games
Video games developed in the United States